Barratt O'Hara (April 28, 1882 – August 11, 1969) of Chicago was an American Democratic politician serving as a U.S. Congressman from Illinois and lieutenant governor of Illinois. He was the last Spanish–American War veteran to serve in Congress.

Early life
Barratt O'Hara was born in Saint Joseph, Michigan (Berrien County) April 28, 1882; attended the public schools of Berrien Springs and Benton Harbor; went to Nicaragua with his father and attended school at San Juan del Norte; at the age of fifteen years enlisted during the Spanish–American War and served as a corporal in Company I, Thirty-third Michigan Volunteer Infantry, at the Siege of Santiago. In 1906, O'Hara married Florence Hoffman who was the daughter of hymn writer Elisha Hoffman.

Newspaper service
After two years O'Hara returned to Benton Harbor and graduated from high school; reporter, Benton Harbor Evening News, 1900; attended Missouri University in 1901 and 1902 and Northwestern University in 1909 and 1910; graduated from Chicago-Kent College of Law in 1912; sporting editor of St. Louis, Mo., Chronicle in 1902 and the Chicago American 1903–1905; editor with Chicago Chronicle in 1906, Chicago Examiner 1907–1910, and Chicago Magazine and Sunday Telegram 1910–1912; Lieutenant Governor of Illinois 1913–1917; chairman of Illinois senate vice and wage investigations 1913–1915; was admitted to the bar in 1912 and commenced the practice of law in Chicago, Ill..

Political career
O'Hara was elected lieutenant governor of Illinois in 1912 and served from 1913 through 1917.

O'Hara was an unsuccessful Democratic candidate for the United States Senate in 1914; during the First World War served as a major with the Eightieth and Twelfth Infantry Divisions and later as divisional judge advocate of the Fifteenth Division; president of the Arizona Film Co., in 1916 and 1917; unsuccessful candidate for governor in 1920, and for Congressman-at-large in 1936 to the Seventy-fifth Congress; radio commentator in Chicago 1933–1935; elected as a Democrat to the Eighty-first Congress (January 3, 1949 – January 3, 1951); unsuccessful candidate for reelection in 1950 to the Eighty-second Congress; elected to the Eighty-third and to the seven succeeding Congresses (January 3, 1953 – January 3, 1969); unsuccessful Democratic candidate for renomination in 1968; died in Washington, D.C., August 11, 1969; interment in Oak Woods Cemetery in Chicago.

References

  Retrieved on 2008-02-09

External links
 

1882 births
1969 deaths
People from St. Joseph, Michigan
Lawyers from Chicago
Politicians from Chicago
Democratic Party members of the United States House of Representatives from Illinois
Lieutenant Governors of Illinois
Chicago-Kent College of Law alumni
United States Army officers
Military personnel from Illinois
Military personnel from Michigan
American military personnel of the Spanish–American War
United States Army personnel of World War I
20th-century American newspaper editors
20th-century American politicians
20th-century American lawyers